Austrian inventions and discoveries are objects, processes or techniques invented or discovered  partially or entirely by a person born in Austria. In some cases, their Austrianess is determined by the fact that they were born in Austria, of non-Austrian people working in the country. Often, things discovered for the first time are also called "inventions", and in many cases, there is no clear line between the two.

The following is a list of inventions or discoveries generally believed to be Austrian:

Astronomy 
 Cosmic ray, discovery by Victor Francis Hess (nobel prize)

Chemistry 
 Alkaline battery by Karl Kordesch jointly co-inventor (together with Canadian Lewis Urry)

 Cori cycle by Carl Cori and Gerti Cori
 Soman by Richard Kuhn (nobel prize), works on carotenoids and vitamins

Cuisine 
 Kaiserschmarrn
 Mozartkugel by Paul Fürst

 Sachertorte by Franz Sacher
 Salzburger Nockerl

Geology 
 Continent Gondwana by Eduard Suess
 Tethys Ocean by Eduard Suess

Information technology  
 Drum memory by Gustav Tauschek
 Printed circuit board by Paul Eisler

Media, Film and Television 

 Slow motion by August Musger

Medicine 
 Main blood groups by Karl Landsteiner (nobel prize)  co-discovered with Alexander S. Wiener
 Psychoanalysis by Sigmund Freud
 Rhesus factor by Karl Landsteiner
 polio virus. co-discovered  by Karl Landsteiner (with Constantin Levaditi and Erwin Popper)
 Hand disinfection/washing hands by Ignaz Semmelweis

Military 
 Blow forward (Steyr Mannlicher M1894)
 Glock, A brand of polymer-frame semi-automatic pistols 
 Salvator Dormus, first patented semi-automatic pistol

Physics 

 Density functional theory by Walter Kohn (1998 nobel prize of Chemistry) 
 Schrödinger equation by Erwin Schrödinger
 Pauli exclusion principle by Wolfgang Pauli

Toys 

 Altekruse Puzzle by Wilhelm Altekruse
 Snow globe by Erwin Perzy

Transportation 

 Giesl ejector by Adolph Giesl-Gieslingen
 Internal combustion engine by Siegfried Marcus
 Kaplan turbine by Viktor Kaplan
 Rumpler Tropfenwagen by Edmund Rumpler
 Valier-Heylandt Rak 7 by Max Valier

Miscellaneous
 The Turk, a chess-playing automaton and Wolfgang von Kempelen's Speaking Machine by Wolfgang von Kempelen

See also
English inventions and discoveries
Science in Medieval Western Europe
German inventions and discoveries
American inventions and discoveries

References

 
Inventions and discoveries
Lists of inventions or discoveries